The following is a list of awards and nominations received by American comedian Jon Stewart.

Stewart is an American comedian writer, producer, political commentator, actor, and television host. He served as the host of The Jon Stewart Show (1993-1995) on MTV. From 1999 to 2015 he served as the host of The Daily Show with Jon Stewart on Comedy Central. It was announced that he will host the upcoming Apple TV+ series The Problem with Jon Stewart starting in 2021.

He has received two Daytime Emmy Award nominations and 53 Primetime Emmy Award nominations winning 22 awards for his work on The Daily Show and The Colbert Report. He has also received two Grammy Award nominations winning twice for Best Comedy Album for America (The Book): A Citizen's Guide to Democracy Inaction in 2005 and Best Spoken Word Album for Earth (The Book): A Visitor's Guide to the Human Race in 2011.

He has also received five Peabody Awards for his work on The Daily Show with Jon Stewart in 2000 and 2004, The Colbert Report in 2007, and 2011, and for the final season of The Daily Show with Jon Stewart in 2015. He has received twelve Producers Guild of America Award nominations winning seven times for The Daily Show and ten Writers Guild of America Awards winning once awards for The Daily Show

Major associations

Emmy Awards

Grammy Awards

Peabody Awards

Guild awards

Producers Guild Awards

Writers Guild Awards

Critics awards 
TCA Awards

Miscellaneous awards

Honours 
 2019 - Stewart received the Bronze Medallion for his "tireless advocacy, inspiration, and leadership (helping to) pass the permanent authorization of the September 11th Victim Compensation Fund Act"

References

External links

Stewart, Jon
The Daily Show
Jon Stewart